Dracula ubangina is a species of orchid. It was classified in the 1980s and is native to Ecuador.

ubangina
Endemic orchids of Ecuador
Plants described in 1980